Shandiz Rural District is a rural district (dehestan) in Shandiz District, Torqabeh and Shandiz County, Razavi Khorasan Province, Iran. At the 2006 census, its population was 15,431, in 4,132 families.  The rural district has 22 villages.

References 

Rural Districts of Razavi Khorasan Province
Torqabeh and Shandiz County